The women's 5000 metres event at the 1996 World Junior Championships in Athletics was held in Sydney, Australia, at International Athletic Centre on 23 and 25 August.

Medalists

Results

Final
25 August

Heats
23 August

Heat 1

Heat 2

Participation
According to an unofficial count, 24 athletes from 18 countries participated in the event.

References

5000 metres
Long distance running at the World Athletics U20 Championships